Bruno Nazaire Kongawoin (born 12 October 1966) is a Central African former basketball player. Born in Bangui, he played college basketball for the Houston Baptist Huskies from 1983 to 1987 and was a two-time All-Trans America Athletic Conference (TAAC) selection during his final two years. Kongawoin participated at the 1988 Summer Olympics with the Central African Republic national basketball team. Following the Games, he was released by the Milwaukee Bucks of the National Basketball Association (NBA) just prior to the 1988–89 season. He was previously released by the Bucks prior to the 1987–88 NBA season.

Kongawoin was inducted into the Houston Baptist University Athletics Hall of Honor in 2016.

References

External links
College statistics

1966 births
Living people
Basketball players at the 1988 Summer Olympics
Central African Republic men's basketball players
Guards (basketball)
Houston Christian Huskies men's basketball players
Olympic basketball players of the Central African Republic
Central African Republic expatriate basketball people in the United States
People from Bangui